George W. Price, Jr. (ca. 1843-October 22, 1901) was a laborer, sailor, and politician in North Carolina. An African American, he served in the North Carolina House of Representatives and North Carolina Senate during the Reconstruction era.

Enslaved from birth in North Carolina, he worked as a plasterer to build a number of Wilmington landmarks, including the Bellamy Mansion and Thalian Hall. In 1862, along with William B. Gould and others, Price ran from slavery and joined the U. S Navy.  After Emancipation, Price was elected state representative and senator from New Hanover County, North Carolina.

Prior to the Civil War, Price was enslaved by George Benticott. During a rainy night on September 21, 1862, Price escaped with seven other enslaved men by rowing a small boat  down the Cape Fear River. Just as the dawn was breaking, they rushed out into the Atlantic Ocean near Fort Caswell. There, the USS Cambridge of the Union blockade picked them up as contraband. Though they had no way of knowing it, within an hour and a half of their rescue President Abraham Lincoln convened a meeting of his cabinet to finalize plans to issue the Emancipation Proclamation.

Price enlisted into the United States Navy on board the Cambridge, but may have later deserted. He corresponded with William B. Gould throughout the war. After the war, Price grew to have considerable influence within the Black and Republican communities and was elected to the North Carolina House of Representatives from 1869-1870 and the North Carolina Senate from 1870 to 1872.

Price was known as an orator, and frequently spoke at ceremonies around North Carolina. In 1881, he led a Black delegation to Washington D.C. where they protested the unfair distribution of federal jobs to President James A. Garfield.

Notes

See also

 African-American officeholders during and following the Reconstruction era

References

Works cited 

1843 births
1901 deaths
Politicians from Wilmington, North Carolina
North Carolina state senators
Members of the North Carolina House of Representatives
African Americans in the American Civil War
African-American United States Navy personnel
Literate American slaves
19th-century American slaves